The Fossarininae are a taxonomic subfamily of very small to large sea snails, marine gastropod molluscs in the family Trochidae, common name top snails.

Genera
 Broderipia Gray, 1847
 Clydonochilus P. Fischer, 1890
 Fossarina A. Adams & Angas, 1864
 Minopa Iredale, 1924
 Synaptocochlea Pilsbry, 1890
Synonyms
 Minos Hutton, 1884: synonym of Fossarina A. Adams & Angas, 1864

References

 Williams S.T., Donald K.M., Spencer H.G. & Nakano T. (2010) Molecular systematics of the marine gastropod families Trochidae and Calliostomatidae (Mollusca: Superfamily Trochoidea). Molecular Phylogenetics and Evolution 54:783-809.

Trochidae